Pi Studios was a computer game software developer founded in 2002 by Robert Erwin, John Faulkenbury, Rob Heironimus, Dan Kramer and Peter Mack whose first commercial work can be found in Activision's Call of Duty: United Offensive.  The company originated in Plano, Texas and relocated to Houston, Texas in January, 2005.

In November, 2005, Pi Studios released Call of Duty 2: Big Red One for the PlayStation 2, the Xbox, and the GameCube.  Work on that project was done jointly with Activision's internal studio, Treyarch.  This led to work on Call of Duty 3 in October 2006, developed jointly with Treyarch.  Pi's work on the Call of Duty franchise continued with the Call of Duty 3 Bravo Map Pack (downloadable via Xbox Live Arcade) followed by Call of Duty: World at War, in which they assisted Treyarch in creating the single player mission "Blowtorch and Corkscrew".

Pi Studios helped develop the Halo 2 Vista editing toolset and exclusive multiplayer map content, which was included with the game.

Pi Studios also developed Mercenaries 2: World in Flames on PlayStation 2 which was released in the United States on August 31, 2008, and in Europe on September 5, 2008.

Pi Studios is responsible for the PlayStation 2 and Wii versions of Rock Band, which shipped December 18, 2007 and June 22, 2008, respectively.  These were developed in conjunction with Harmonix.  Pi Studios also worked with Harmonix to produce four Rock Band Track Packs for the Wii and PlayStation 2.  The two companies' final collaborative effort was on The Beatles: Rock Band for the (Wii), released in 2009.
Bomberman Live: Battlefest for Xbox Live Arcade, released in December 2010.

Pi Studios was developing Bonk: Brink of Extinction for release on Xbox Live Arcade, PlayStation 3 and Wii but it was cancelled.

In March 2011, it was announced that Pi Studios was closed as former employees have now formed a new development team called Category 6 Studios, which currently has around 15 members including co-founder and industry veteran Kenn Hoekstra.

Games developed
Bonk: Brink of Extinction (Cancelled)
Quake Arena Arcade (2010)
Call of Duty: Black Ops (2010)
Bomberman Live: Battlefest (2010)
The Beatles: Rock Band (Wii) (2009)
Wolfenstein (2009)
Rock Band Classic Rock (PlayStation 2 / PlayStation 3 / Xbox 360 / Wii) (2009)
Call of Duty: World at War (2008)
Rock Band 2 (PlayStation 2) (2008)
Rock Band 2 (Wii) (2008)
Mercenaries 2: World in Flames (PS2) (2008)
Rock Band Track Pack Vol. 1 (PlayStation 2 / Wii) (2008)
Rock Band Track Pack Vol. 2 (PlayStation 2 / PlayStation 3 / Xbox 360 / Wii) (2008)
Rock Band AC/DC (PlayStation 2 / PlayStation 3 / Xbox 360 / Wii) (2008)
Rock Band (Wii) (2008)
Rock Band (PlayStation 2) (2007)
Halo 2 (Windows PC) (2007)
Call of Duty 3 (2006)
Call of Duty 2: Big Red One (2005)
Call of Duty: United Offensive (2004)

References

External links

Video game companies established in 2002
Video game companies disestablished in 2011
Defunct video game companies of the United States
Video game development companies
Companies based in Houston
2002 establishments in Texas
2011 disestablishments in Texas
Defunct companies based in Texas